Ernest Roland Duncan (25 January 1916 – November 25, 1990) was a New Zealand-born mathematician, Australian headmaster and American 
professor.

Early career
Duncan was born in Clyde, New Zealand, and graduated from the University of Otago. As an educator he rose to the position of inspector of schools for the New Zealand Education Department and made a significant contribution to the introduction of the new mathematics curriculum. He wrote text books that were extensively used in New Zealand primary schools and which were also published in the United States. In 1958 he moved to the North America as a university lecturer and he received his doctorate from Columbia University.

Australian headmaster
In 1961, Duncan became headmaster of Newington College, an inner-city Sydney private boys school. He immediately proposed that the school should be moved to a larger site in the northern suburbs but this suggestion met with resistance from the college council. Before the end of the academic year he had resigned and returned to the United States.

American professor
In 1962, Duncan became professor of mathematics at Rutgers University and at the time of his retirement, in 1977, was chairman of the department of curriculum and instruction in the Graduate School of Education. In 1982 he set aside a Trust fund to endow annual awards for "excellent teachers of Mathematics" in New Zealand and the United States. He died in a Morristown, New Jersey hospital of leukemia on November 25, 1990. He lived in Bernardsville, New Jersey and was survived by his wife, Lois, two daughters and a son.

References

Publications
 Modern School Mathematics, published by Houghton Mifflin

Sources
 D. S. Macmillan, Newington College 1863–1963 (Syd, 1963)
 P. L. Swain, Newington Across the Years 1863–1998 (Syd, 1999)
 A. H. McLintock, Encyclopaedia of New Zealand, 'Expatriates – Biographies' (N.Z., 1966)

External links
 The New York Times Obituary 
 Ernest Duncan Awards for Teaching Mathematics 

1916 births
1990 deaths
20th-century American mathematicians
Deaths from cancer in New Jersey
Deaths from leukemia
New Zealand educators
People from Bernardsville, New Jersey
People from Clyde, New Zealand
Staff of Newington College
Australian headmasters
University of Otago alumni
New Zealand emigrants to Australia
Australian emigrants to the United States